Brenda & the Tabulations were an American R&B group, formed in 1966 in Philadelphia, Pennsylvania, United States, originally composed of Brenda Payton, Eddie L. Jackson, Maurice Coates and Jerry Jones.

History
The group had a distinctive, almost doo-wop sound, especially at the start, featuring Payton's sweet occasionally rough-edged vocals with  background male harmonies.  The line-up changed around 1971 with the original three men departing.  Two female backing singers (Pat Mercer and Deborah Martin) were brought into the group.

Brenda and the Tabulations had one major US hit, entitled "Dry Your Eyes". The group also worked with producer and recording artist Van McCoy with whom they scored the moderate US hit "Right on the Tip of my Tongue". Several other songs became hits or moderate hits on the US soul singles chart from the late 1960s to the late 1970s.  

The group has released a total of three albums: Dry Your Eyes on Dionn Records (1967), Brenda and the Tabulations on Top & Bottom Records (1970), and I Keep Coming Back For More on Chocolate City/Casablanca (1977), although by the time of the last album, Brenda Payton was relatively a solo act while keeping the group name. The group had also signed with Epic Records in 1972 with four singles being released. One of the Epic singles, "One Girl Too Late", charted on the soul chart.

Brenda & the Tabulations are one of many recording artists referenced in the song "Life Is a Rock (But the Radio Rolled Me)" by the studio group Reunion.

Brenda Payton, born on October 24, 1945, died on June 14, 1992, aged 46. Eddie L. Jackson died on May 3, 2010, from a brain aneurysm at the age of 63.

The group's music saw a revival in 2011, when the song "The Wash" from the album Dry Your Eyes was licensed by Unilever for use in an Axe body wash commercial.

"Who’s Lovin' You" was one of the Desert Island Discs chosen by Keith Richards for Pulse! magazine (now defunct) and reprinted for a 1999 satirical piece in The New Yorker.

Discography

Studio albums

Compilation albums

Singles

References

American rhythm and blues musical groups
Musical groups from Philadelphia
Jamie Records artists
Apex Records artists
Northern soul musicians
Casablanca Records artists